Daniel George Edward Hall (1891–1979) was a British historian, author, and academic. He wrote extensively on the history of Burma. His most notable work is A History of Southeast Asia, said to "...remain the most important single history of the region, providing  encyclopedic coverage of material published up to the time of its 1981 revision." He held professorships in Southeast Asian history at both Cornell University and the University of London – where he eventually became professor emeritus.

Biography

Early life
Daniel George Edward Hall was born on 17 November 1891 into a farming family in Hertfordshire, England. His early education was at Hitchin Grammar School. He entered the Department of History in King's College London in 1913 and graduated in 1916 with a first-class honors degree in Modern History, winning the Gladstone Memorial Prize. Hall also won an Inglis Studentship that allowed him to gain a Master's degree from the University of London with a thesis on mercantile aspects of English foreign policy during the reign of Charles II. During the First World War Hall served in the army with Inns of Court Regiment, and also toured the Western Front with the Lena Ashworth concert party.

Career
In early 1919, Hall obtained a position as senior history master at Royal Grammar School, Worcester. Later that year Hall married Helen Eugenie Banks (who, two years his junior at King's College, had also been awarded the Gladstone Memorial Prize) and began teaching history at Bedales School, Hampshire.

While at Bedales School, Hall was offered the position of chair of history at the recently founded University of Rangoon. Upon his arrival in Rangoon in May 1921, Hall was faced with a history syllabus was that was unsuited to the new university, being focused on classical Greece, Rome and modern European history. His initial task therefore was to create courses and provide textbooks that were relevant to the needs of his Burmese students. It was while engaged in this task, and developing the local history content of the syllabus, that Hall became interested in Burmese culture and Asian studies. However his full-scale pursuit of these interests had to wait until he had completed  the task of developing and teaching the Western history syllabus of the university.

Thus it was not until 1927 that the first results of Hall's research into Anglo-Burmese relations was published with his paper “English Relations with Burma, 1587–1686" published in the Journal of the Burma Research Society, 1927. The completion of further research, including The Dalhousie-Phayre Correspondence, led to Hall being awarded a degree of Doctor of Literature by the University of London.
In 1934 Hall was forced to resign his chair in Rangoon and return to England due to his family having  developed trachoma, which made it impossible for them to remain in the tropics. Upon his return to England Hall took up the position of Headmaster of Caterham School in Surrey. Hall left Caterham in 1949 when he was appointed chair of the History of South East Asia department at the University of London School of Oriental and African Studies. It was while at SOAS that Hall published his History of South-East Asia (1955), the center-piece of his work. In September 1959 Hall retired from the University of London and took up a visiting professor position at Cornell University. After retiring from Cornell and returning to England in 1973, Hall published his biography of Henry Burney in 1975.

Hall died on 12 October 1979.

Books and publications
1922: A Professorship of Far Eastern History JBRS
1925: A Brief Survey of English Constitutional History London: Harrap.
1927:  English Relations with Burma, 1587–1686  Journal of the Burma Research Society
1928: Early English Intercourse With Burma, 1587–1743 Rangoon University Publications
1935: A High School British History, 1714–1930, for Burma, India and the East Oxford University Press
1945: Europe and Burma: A study of European Relations with Burma to the Annexation of Thibaw's Kingdom,1886 London: Oxford University Press
1950: Burma London: Hutchinson's University Library
1955: A History of Southeast Asia  London: Macmillan Limited
1955: Michael Symes, Journal of his Second Embassy to the Court of Ava in 1802 London: George Allen and Unwin
1974: Henry Burney: A Political Biography London: Oxford University Press

Notes

AIM25 Project Identity Statement (Reference code: GB 0102 PP MS 18)

External links
 

1891 births
1979 deaths
Alumni of King's College London
Historians of Southeast Asia
Alumni of SOAS University of London
Cornell University faculty
People educated at Hitchin Boys' School
Academic staff of the University of Yangon
20th-century British historians